Uruguay held local government elections on May 10, 2015, electing the intendente of the 19 departments that are the administrative divisions of Uruguay, as well as 112 local governments.

This was the second time that both intendentes and alcaldes were elected simultaneously.

Background 
In the municipal elections of May 2010, the Partido Nacional had won 12 departments, the Partido Colorado 2 departments, and the Frente Amplio 5 departments.

Canelones
A former stronghold of the Colorado Party, Canelones has been held by the Broad Front coalition since 2005, and once again this party was the winner:
Yamandú Orsi (winner)
José Carlos Mahía

Montevideo
In the capital of the country, the National and Colorado Party ran as a common list. The candidates were as follows:
Jorge Gandini
Ney Castillo
Edgardo Novick
Álvaro Garcé
Ricardo Rachetti
The winning party was, though, the incumbent Broad Front:
Daniel Martínez (winner)
Lucía Topolansky

See also 
2014 Uruguayan general election

References

External links 
  

Local and municipal elections in Uruguay
2015 elections in South America
Municipal elections
May 2015 events in South America